Anna Belousovová (born 8 August 1959) is a Slovak politician and a former Deputy Speaker of the National Council of Slovakia.

Political career
In 1990 Anna Belousovová became a founding member of the Slovak National Party, which she led between the years 1999 and 2003, making her the first female leader in the party's history. The intra-party rivalry with Ján Slota led to her removal from party leadership in 2010 and subsequent expulsion from the party in 2011.

She was elected as a member of the National Council in the 1998 - 2002, 2006 - 2010 and 2010 - 2012 terms. Between 2006 and 2010 she served as a Deputy Speaker of the council.

Personal life
In 2001 she married a Russian businessman Alexander Belousov, who died in 2004.

References

1959 births
Living people
People from Čadca District
Slovak National Party politicians
Members of the National Council (Slovakia) 1998-2002
Members of the National Council (Slovakia) 2002-2006
Members of the National Council (Slovakia) 2010-2012
21st-century Slovak politicians
21st-century Slovak women politicians
Slovak schoolteachers
Female members of the National Council (Slovakia)
20th-century Slovak women politicians
20th-century Slovak politicians